In Greek mythology, the Epimēliads or Epimēlides (Ancient Greek: Επιμηλιδες means "those who care for flocks") are dryad nymphs who are protectors of apple trees. However, the word for "apple" (μηλον) in ancient Greek texts is also the word for "sheep". This translation gives Epimeliads as protectors of sheep and goats. Their hair is white, like apple blossoms or undyed wool. They are also called Maliades or Meliades (Μηλιαδες) which means "of sheep" or "of apples". Like other dryads, they can shape-shift from trees to humans. They are also known to be the guards of the tree that the Golden Fleece was kept on.

List of Epimeliads 
 Hesperides
 Penelope
 Sinoe
 Sose
 Lampetia
 Phaethusa

Dryads
Nymphs

Apples in culture